Shanice Dileita Mohamed (born 1993), known as Shay Lia, is a French-Djiboutian musician based in Montreal, Quebec. Best known for her collaborations with Kaytranada, her solo debut EP Dangerous was longlisted for the 2019 Polaris Music Prize.

Born in France and raised in Djibouti, Lia moved to Montreal in 2012 to study communication at the Université du Québec à Montréal. She is the daughter of Dileita Mohamed Dileita, the former Prime Minister of Djibouti. While in Montreal she posted videos of herself singing various songs to social media, one of which attracted Kaytranada's attention and led to them becoming regular collaborators, including on the song "Leave Me Alone" from Kaytranada's 2016 album 99.9% and his 2018 single "Chances", for which both Kaytranada and Lia received a nomination for the SOCAN Songwriting Prize in 2019.

Lia released a number of solo singles in 2018 before releasing Dangerous in May 2019.

References

1993 births
Living people
Afar people
Djiboutian emigrants to Canada
Singers from Montreal
21st-century Black Canadian women singers
21st-century Djiboutian women singers